Bernard Luttmer (born 21 June 1979) is a Canadian sailor. He competed in the Laser event at the 2004 Summer Olympics.

References

External links
 
 

1979 births
Living people
Canadian male sailors (sport)
Olympic sailors of Canada
Sailors at the 2004 Summer Olympics – Laser
Sportspeople from Toronto